Ole Käuper (born 9 January 1997) is a German professional footballer who plays as a central midfielder for SV Meppen.

Career
Born in Bremen, Ole Käuper was with ATSV Sebaldsbrück before joining Werder Bremen on 1 July 2005.

On 24 October 2015, Käuper made his debut for Werder Bremen II in a 4–0 win over Erzgebirge Aue.

In September 2017, he was handed his first professional contract by Werder Bremen. He was first called up to the first-team squad for the club's Bundesliga match away to Bayer Leverkusen on 13 December and made his debut, playing the first 73 minutes.

On 6 January 2019, Käuper joined 2. Bundesliga club Erzgebirge Aue on a 1.5-year loan until the end of 2019–20 season. In April he was suspended for "disciplinary reasons". On 17 June 2019, the loan was cut short.

One day after being released from his Aue contract, Käuper agreed to a season-long loan move to 3. Liga side FC Carl Zeiss Jena.

He joined Slovak First Football League club FC Nitra on loan until the end of the season in January 2021.

In June 2021, Käuper agreed the termination of his contract with Werder Bremen and joined SV Meppen of the 3. Liga. He signed a two-year contract with Meppen.

References

External links
 

1997 births
Living people
Footballers from Bremen
German footballers
Association football midfielders
Germany youth international footballers
SV Werder Bremen II players
SV Werder Bremen players
FC Erzgebirge Aue players
FC Carl Zeiss Jena players
FC Nitra players
SV Meppen players
Bundesliga players
2. Bundesliga players
3. Liga players
Regionalliga players
German expatriate footballers
German expatriate sportspeople in Slovakia
Expatriate footballers in Slovakia